Zaki Nazih Oualah (born 3 April 1995) is an Algerian professional footballer who plays for English club Weymouth, as a goalkeeper.

Career
Oualah played for numerous English non-league clubs, including Hendon, Hayes & Yeading United, Farnborough, Aylesbury United, Bedford Town, Merstham, Burnham, Leighton Town, Godalming Town, Harefield United, Hungerford Town, Uxbridge, Metropolitan Police (making one appearance in October 2014) and Leatherhead. He signed a short-term deal with Aldershot Town in August 2018, and played for Hendon between June 2018 and September 2018.

He also played for Algerian club US Biskra.

He turned professional with AFC Wimbledon in July 2021, having spent seven seasons training with the club. He moved on loan to Billericay Town on 5 February 2022, making his debut that same day.

He signed for Weymouth in October 2022.

References

1995 births
Living people
Algerian footballers
US Biskra players
Uxbridge F.C. players
Godalming Town F.C. players
Hungerford Town F.C. players
Harefield United F.C. players
Metropolitan Police F.C. players
Leighton Town F.C. players
Burnham F.C. players
Merstham F.C. players
Bedford Town F.C. players
Aylesbury United F.C. players
Farnborough F.C. players
Leatherhead F.C. players
Hayes & Yeading United F.C. players
Hendon F.C. players
Aldershot Town F.C. players
AFC Wimbledon players
Billericay Town F.C. players
Weymouth F.C. players
Association football goalkeepers
Algerian expatriate footballers
Algerian expatriates in England
Expatriate footballers in England
21st-century Algerian people
National League (English football) players
English people of Algerian descent